Christopher Joll is a British military historian, author and military event organiser best known for managing the British Military Tournament.  His books include a fifteen volume series of historical action-adventure stories, The Speedicut Papers & The Speedicut Memoirs, published by AuthorHouse; Uniquely British: A Year in the Life of the Household Cavalry (2012) published by Tricorn Books; The Drum Horse in the Fountain & Other Tales of the Heroes & Rogues in the Guards (2018); and Spoils of War: The Treasures, Trophies & Trivia of the British Empire (2019); Black Ice: The Memoirs of Corie Mapp (2021); The Imperial Impresario: The Treasures, Trophies & Trivia of Napoleon's Theatre of Power (2021) - all published by Nine Elms Books. He is also a regular contributor to Britain at War magazine.
 
Joll was educated at Oxford University and the Royal Military Academy Sandhurst, and served for seven years as an officer in The Life Guards, including four tours of duty in Northern Ireland.

He has devised and managed Royal and Military pageants for charities including the Household Cavalry Pageant; the Royal Hospital Chelsea Pageant.; and the Gurkha 200 Pageant. He is currently the Regimental Historian of the Household Cavalry, a Trustee of the Museum Prize Trust, and a guest speaker for Viking Cruises and Noble Caledonia.

Between 2001 and 2013 he and his partner were responsible for restoring Sham Castle, an 18th-century gothic folly in Shropshire.

References

External links 
 

1948 births
Living people
People educated at Oundle School
English historians
Military writers
21st-century British writers
Alumni of the University of Oxford
Graduates of the Royal Military Academy Sandhurst